Lathao is a village in Lohit district of Arunachal Pradesh, India. As per the 2011 Census of India, Lathao has a population of 2,756 people including 1,466 males and 1,290 females.

References 

Villages in Lohit district